The 1945–46 National Hurling League was the 15th season of the National Hurling League. This was the first league to be played since 1940-41 because of fuel shortages and rationing during the Emergency.

Resumption

In August 1945 the Central Council of the Gaelic Athletic Association announced that they would resume the National Leagues in both hurling and Gaelic football. It was decided to divide the participating teams into small groups to ensure minimum travelling and in an effort to reduce costs due to the strict fuel rationing measures which remained due to World War II.

National Hurling League

Cork came into the season as defending champions of the 1940-41 season.

On 21 July 1946, Clare won the title following a 2-10 to 2-5 win over Dublin in a replay of the final. It was their first ever league title.

Group 1 table

Group 2 table

Group 3 table

Play-off

Knock-out stage

Semi-final

Finals

References

National Hurling League seasons
League
League